The mixed relay triathlon was part of the Triathlon at the 2014 Asian Games program, was held in Songdo Central Park Triathlon Venue on September 26, 2014.

The race was held in four legs each one consisted of  swimming,  road bicycle racing, and  road running.

Schedule
All times are Korea Standard Time (UTC+09:00)

Results

References 

Results

External links 
Official website

Triathlon at the 2014 Asian Games